Paralebeda plagifera is a moth of the  family Lasiocampidae. It is found in northern and central India, Nepal, southern and south-eastern China, northern Thailand, northern Vietnam and Taiwan.

The wingspan is about 59–94 mm.

The larvae have been recorded feeding on Macaranga tanarius.

References

Moths described in 1855
Lasiocampidae